Fornelli is an Italian surname. Notable people with the surname include:

Bob Fornelli (born 1966), American college baseball coach
Cynthia M. Fornelli, American accountant and securities lawyer

Italian-language surnames